Hangtou may refer to the following towns in China:

Hangtou, Shanghai
Hangtou, Zhejiang, in Jiande, Zhejiang